Hamada Dam is a gravity dam located in Shimane Prefecture in Japan. The dam is used for flood control and power production. The catchment area of the dam is 33.8 km2. The dam impounds about 27  ha of land when full and can store 5000 thousand cubic meters of water. The construction of the dam was started on 1959 and completed in 1962.

References

Dams in Shimane Prefecture
1962 establishments in Japan